Mount Dickerman, or Dickerman Mountain, is a mountain in Mount Baker-Snoqualmie National Forest in Washington state.  It is located northwest of Barlow Pass along the Mountain Loop Highway. A strenuous four mile trail leads from this highway to the summit with views which includes Glacier Peak, Monte Cristo Peak, and Sloan Peak.

The mountain was named after Alton L. Dickerman (1850–1921), the consulting geologist for the Monte Cristo Mining Company.

Climate
Dickerman is located in the marine west coast climate zone of western North America. Most weather fronts originate in the Pacific Ocean, and travel northeast toward the Cascade Mountains. As fronts approach the North Cascades, they are forced upward by the peaks of the Cascade Range, causing them to drop their moisture in the form of rain or snowfall onto the Cascades (Orographic lift). As a result, the west side of the North Cascades experiences high precipitation, especially during the winter months in the form of snowfall. Due to its temperate climate and proximity to the Pacific Ocean, areas west of the Cascade Crest very rarely experience temperatures below  or above . During winter months, weather is usually cloudy, but, due to high pressure systems over the Pacific Ocean that intensify during summer months, there is often little or no cloud cover during the summer. Because of maritime influence, snow tends to be wet and heavy, resulting in high avalanche danger.

See also 

Geography of the North Cascades
Mountain peaks of the United States

References

External links
 Alton L. Dickerman: Biography and photo
Weather forecast: Mount Dickerman

Cascade Range
Mountains of Washington (state)
Mountains of Snohomish County, Washington